The  is a type of 4-6-2 steam locomotive built in Japan from 1935 to 1937. A total of 62 Class C55 locomotives were built and designed by Hideo Shima.

Nine were supplied to the Taiwan Government Railway, where they became class CT250, while 21 locomotives numbered C55 20 - C55 40 were streamlined.

Preserved examples
, four Class C55 locomotives have been preserved in Japan, as follows.

 C55 1: preserved at the Kyoto Railway Museum
 C55 50: preserved at the Otaru Museum in Otaru, Hokkaido
 C55 52: preserved in front of Yoshimatsu Station in Kagoshima Prefecture
 C55 53: preserved at Wakakusa Park in Oita, Oita

See also 
 Japan Railways locomotive numbering and classification
JNR Class C54
JNR Class C57
JNR Class C56

References

1067 mm gauge locomotives of Japan
Steam locomotives of Japan
Steam locomotives of Taiwan
4-6-2 locomotives
Preserved steam locomotives of Japan
Railway locomotives introduced in 1935
Passenger locomotives